The sica is a short sword or large dagger of ancient Illyrians, Thracians and Dacians, used in Ancient Rome too, originating in the Halstatt culture. It was originally depicted as a curved sword (see the Zliten mosaic as well as numerous oil lamps) and many examples have been found in what are today Croatia,  Albania, Bosnia and Herzegovina, Bulgaria, Serbia and Romania. It is also depicted on Trajan's Column; notably the Dacian king Decebalus is depicted dying by suicide with one.

Etymology
Possibly from Proto-Albanian tsikā (whence Albanian thikë, "knife"), from Proto-Indo-European ḱey- ("to sharpen") possibly via Illyrian. According to Dictionnaire des Antiquités Grecques et Romaines the name Sica comes from Proto-Indo-European root sek-, meaning "to cut", "to section", however De Vaan declares any connection to Proto-Indo-European sek- to be formally impossible.

Illyrian 
The Romans regarded the sica as a distinctive Illyrian weapon. The principal melee weapon of the Illyrians was the Sica. According to historian John Wilkes:

Although a short curved sword was used by several peoples around the Mediterranean the Romans regarded the sica as a distinct Illyrian weapon used by the stealthy 'assassin' (sicarius)

Types
From a typological point of view, though there is a strong tendency towards standardization, the sica daggers can be organised in three main types that differ only by morphological aspects, not functional.

The first type is characterized by its solidity, sometimes with a broken figure immediately after the blade's middle part, with a short and sharp point, with a slight curvature, a short handle cane, usually of a triangular shape, that has a hole for the fixing rivet, close to the blade. The blade has incised ornaments and a fuller deeply carved into it. These characteristics are not general, the only standing arguments for this type being the size and the shape approximately similar.

The second type, not very different morphologically speaking, does not have the solid shape of the first type, but a longer blade, with a fuller, and keeps, most often, the haft's tongue short and of a triangular shape.

The third type, more numerous, gathers a series of daggers characterized by a long blade, elegantly manufactured in most cases, by the ornamentation with incised circles and/or lines along the blade, the presence of the fuller, the haft's tongue as long as the haft and a guard muff. These distinctive elements are found either all together, or some of the pieces present one or more of these characteristic features. The sizes show a relative standardization, somewhere around 30–40 cm length and approximately 3 cm width. From a chronological point of view, this type of dagger is dated mostly in the 2nd and 1st centuries BC.

Significance

The distinctive shape was designed to get around the sides of an opponent's shield, and stab or slash them in the back.  Since the thraex gladiator's usual opponent was the scutum (large shield) carrying murmillo gladiator, such a weapon as the sica was necessary to make the duel more even and exciting.

The daggers’ decoration, remarkably complex, offers them a sum of spiritual, artistically and symbolical valences. On the blade geometrical shapes were incised, but also eagles and snakes, in which case their schematization requires the existence of a certain "code", or they were an emblem that underlined the membership of a certain brotherhood at arms or a certain social status, as well possible to have a mystical/magical component included.
 
From the facts presented above, it can be stated that the sica dagger represents an important historical artifact which, due to its importance and the role it played in the Thracian world, contributes to the understanding of the social and military mechanisms of this society and, through the special spiritual dimension, to the reception of a new side from the religious mosaic of this people. From all the curved weapons used in the Thracian area, the sica daggers are the only ones that make the connection between the Southern Thracians and the Thracians North to the Danube, being spread the same on both sides of the river.

See also
 Sicarii, either of two Jewish extremist groups
 Dacian warfare
 Falx
 Gladiator
 Gladius
 Illyrian warfare
 Ludus Dacicus
 Pugio
 Spatha
 Thracian warfare

References

External links

 https://www.scribd.com/document/33875732/Borangic-C-Sica-Tipologie-Si-Functional-It-Ate-NEMVS-IV-7-8-2009
 www.enciclopedia-dacica.ro http://enciclopedia-dacica.ro/index.php?option=com_content&view=article&id=709&Itemid=377
 Dictionnaire des Antiquités Grecques et Romaines, tom 4, vol. 2 (R–S), Paris, 1926, p. 1300, s.v. sica

Ancient weapons
Blade weapons
Thracian culture
Dacia
Dacian weapons
Illyrian warfare
Roman swords